Ali Badara Dia (born 1941) is a Guinean former footballer. He competed in the men's tournament at the 1968 Summer Olympics.

References

External links
 

1941 births
Living people
Guinean footballers
Guinea international footballers
Olympic footballers of Guinea
Footballers at the 1968 Summer Olympics
Sportspeople from Conakry
Association football forwards